Wetworks (1995) is an original novel written by Dave Stone and based on the long-running British science fiction comic strip Judge Dredd. It is Stone's third Judge Dredd novel.

Synopsis
A massive conspiracy to change the world for ever requires the assassination of 3,600 people every day, and Judge Dredd is targeted for murder. Blinded by his would-be killer, he must save the world without his sight.

Continuity
The unnamed female assassin who blinds Dredd first appeared in Culling Crew, a one-off comic strip story in the 1994 Judge Dredd Mega-Special by Dave Stone and Steve Sampson. She would return over ten years later in Stone's Armitage strips in the Judge Dredd Megazine.

External links
Wetworks at the 2000 AD website.

Novels by Dave Stone
Judge Dredd novels